Melocactus pachyacanthus is a species of cactus. It is endemic to Brazil, where it is known only from two locations in Bahia. Its populations are fragmented and it is vulnerable to habitat degradation.

References

Endemic flora of Brazil
pachyacanthus
Endangered plants
Taxonomy articles created by Polbot